An artisan (from) is a skilled craft worker who makes or creates material objects partly or entirely by hand. These objects   may be functional or strictly decorative, for example furniture, decorative art, sculpture, clothing, food items, household items and tools and mechanisms such as the handmade clockwork movement of a watchmaker. Artisans practice a craft and may through experience and aptitude reach the expressive levels of an artist.

History
The adjective "artisanal" is often used in describing hand-processing in contrast to an industrial process, such as in the phrase artisanal mining. Thus,  "artisanal" is sometimes used in marketing and advertising as a buzz word to describe or imply some relation with the crafting of handmade food products, such as bread, beverages or cheese. Many of these have traditionally been handmade, rural or pastoral goods but are also now commonly made on a larger scale with automated mechanization in factories and other industrial areas.

Artisans were the dominant producers of commodities before the Industrial Revolution. 

In ancient Greece, artisans were drawn to agoras and often built workshops nearby.

Medieval artisans
During the Middle Ages, the term "artisan" was applied to those who made things or provided services. It did not apply to unskilled manual labourers. Artisans were divided into two distinct groups: those who operated their own businesses and those who did not. The former were called masters, while the latter were the journeymen and apprentices.

One misunderstanding many people have about this social group is that they picture them as "workers" in the modern sense: employed by someone. The most influential group among the artisans were the masters, the business owners. The owners enjoyed a higher social status in their communities, and often organised into guilds.

Shokunin 
Shokunin is a Japanese word for "artisan" or "craftsman", which also implies a pride in one's own work. In the words of shokunin Tashio Odate:Shokunin means not only having technical skill, but also implies an attitude and social consciousness... a social obligation to work his best for the general welfare of the people, [an] obligation both material and spiritual. Traditionally, shokunin honoured their tools of trade at New Year's – the sharpened and taken-care of tools would be placed in a tokonoma (a container or box still found in Japanese houses and shops), and two rice cakes and a tangerine (on top of rice paper) were placed on top of each toolbox, to honour the tools and express gratitude for performing their task.

Gallery

See also
 Applied arts
 Artist
 Arts and Crafts movement
 Caste – Tarkhan
 Guild
 Handicraft
 Job security
 Tradesman

References

External links

History of Artisans

 
Arts occupations